A National landmark may refer to:

Canada
National Landmarks (Canada)

Saint Lucia
National Landmark, a type of protected area managed by the Saint Lucia National Trust

United States
National Historic Landmark
National Natural Landmark
National Landmark of Soaring, a designation for people, places and events significant in the history of gliders and motorless aviation

See also
Landmark
List of heritage registers
Kulturdenkmal